Sir John Barrington, 7th Baronet (c. 1707– 4 May 1776) of Barrington Hall, Essex was a British politician who sat in the House of Commons for a total of 36 years between 1729 and 1775. 
Barrington was the elder son of Sir John Barrington, 6th Baronet and his wife Susan Draper, daughter of George Draper. He succeeded his father as baronet in August 1717. He married Mary Roberts, daughter of Patricius Roberts.

The Barrington family owned an electoral interest (the Swainston estate) at Newtown (Isle of Wight) where there were fewer than 40 voters. In the 1727 general election Barrington stood for Parliament at Newtown with government support and was initially defeated, but was returned on petition on 25 April 1729 as Member of Parliament. He did not stand in the 1734 general election but was returned unopposed at Newtown in 1741 and 1747. He was returned unopposed again in 1754 and 1761. In the 1768 general election there was a contest and he was successful taking 20 votes to his opponent's 15. He was unopposed again in 1774 but vacated his seat a year later in November 1775.

Barrington died childless on 4 May 1776 and was buried at Lilley, Hertfordshire. He was succeeded in the baronetcy by his younger brother Fitzwilliam Barrington.

References

1700s births
1776 deaths
Baronets in the Baronetage of England
British MPs 1727–1734
British MPs 1741–1747
British MPs 1747–1754
British MPs 1754–1761
British MPs 1761–1768
British MPs 1768–1774
British MPs 1774–1780
Members of the Parliament of Great Britain for Newtown